The Nairobi grass rat (Arvicanthis nairobae) is a species of rodent in the family Muridae.
It is found in Kenya, Tanzania, and possibly Ethiopia.
Its natural habitat is dry savanna.

References

Arvicanthis
Rodents of Africa
Mammals described in 1909
Taxonomy articles created by Polbot